Guido Fantoni (4 February 1919 – 28 December 1974) was a heavyweight Greco-Roman wrestler from Italy who won bronze medals at the 1948 Olympics and 1953 World Championships.

References

1919 births
1974 deaths
Sportspeople from Bologna 
Olympic wrestlers of Italy
Wrestlers at the 1948 Summer Olympics
Wrestlers at the 1952 Summer Olympics
Italian male sport wrestlers
Olympic bronze medalists for Italy
Olympic medalists in wrestling
Medalists at the 1948 Summer Olympics
20th-century Italian people